Tyrone Conraad (born 7 April 1997) is a Dutch professional footballer who plays as a forward for Montenegrin First League club Sutjeska Nikšić.

Club career
As a youth, Conraad played for the football academies of Feyenoord and Sparta Rotterdam. He eventually signed his first professional contract with Sparta but made no official appearances for the club. In the summer of 2016, Conraad moved to SC Cambuur, where he made his professional debut in the Eerste Divisie on 14 October 2016, in a game against FC Den Bosch. He played in six matches for Cambuur during the 2016–17 season before being assigned to the reserves for the duration of the next season. In his third year with Cambuur, Conraad returned to the first squad and played in a total of 24 matches. In the summer of 2019, he moved to third-division club Kozakken Boys on a free transfer, where he emerged as club top-scorer with seven goals in 24 matches.

During the summer transfer window of 2020, Conraad left his home country and joined Greek second-division club Ergotelis on a free transfer.

Personal life
Born in the Netherlands, Conraad is of Surinamese descent.

Conraad is a cousin of former Real Madrid midfielder Royston Drenthe.

Career statistics

Club

References

External links
 
 

1997 births
Living people
Association football forwards
Dutch footballers
Dutch sportspeople of Surinamese descent
Sparta Rotterdam players
SC Cambuur players
Kozakken Boys players
Ergotelis F.C. players
Eerste Divisie players
Tweede Divisie players
Super League Greece 2 players
Footballers from Rotterdam